The Yeidji, also spelt Yiiji and other variants, commonly known as  Gwini/ Kwini, are an Aboriginal Australian people of the Kimberley area of Western Australia, who also self-identify as  Balanggarra.

Name
In contemporary accounts, the Yeidji are often called Gwini, also spelt Kwini, people. Norman Tindale, writing in 1974, maintained that Gwini was a directional term meaning "easterners" used by inlanders. The other term, Kujini means those in the coastal lowlands. There is no clear tribal name for several peoples in this area, and some confusion in the nomenclature and the several tribes, including also the Miwa are generally referred to as the Forrest River people, who, however are occasionally referred to as the Gwini/Yeidji.

Country
Its southern extension touched Steere Hills. The northernmost boundary lay at Mount Carty and the Lyne River. Their neighbours were the Wilawila to the west, the Wenamba to the northwest, the Wirngir to the east, and the Arnga on their southern border. The Guragona horde, though classified as a subgroup of the Wenamba, may have been a section of the Yeidji.

Today they are the traditional owners by succession of Sir Graham Moore Island, off the Kimberley coast. Oral histories and archaeological excavations reveal evidence of interactions with Makassan traders from the 18th century onwards.

Language

Yiiji is a dialect of Wunambal.

Alternative names
 Yiiji
 Yeidji, Yeithi, Yeidthee, Yeeji, Yedji, Jeidji, Jeithi
 Gwi:ni, Gwini, Kuini ("easterners")
 Kujini, Gu:jini,  Kuini, Gujini
 Ombalkari (toponym east of the Forrest River Mission)
 Umbalgari
 Miwu (perhaps a name for the language)
 Miwadange ("saltwater people")
 Waringnari, Waringari (a pejorative exonym suggesting the practice of cannibalism)
 Morokorei (Forrest River horde)
 Wunambal
 Pikkolatpan 
 Bugay
  Worrorran

Notes

Citations

Sources

Aboriginal peoples of Western Australia
Kimberley (Western Australia)